Fereydun Ebrahimi (1919 in Astara – 1947 in Tabriz) was an Iranian Azerbaijani jurist and politician. He was chairman of the Azerbaijani Democratic Party in Astara, and a graduate of faculty of law of Tehran University. Ebrahimi was the Procurator-General of Azerbaijan People's Government in 1945. He was executed in Tabriz after the fall of Azerbaijan People's Government. He is the great uncle of French author Marjane Satrapi.

Notes

References
 *

People from Astara, Iran
1919 births
1947 deaths
20th-century Iranian lawyers
University of Tehran alumni
Azerbaijani Democratic Party politicians
Executed politicians
People executed by Pahlavi Iran
Tudeh Party of Iran members
Executed communists